Lagocephalus spadiceus, also known as the half-smooth golden pufferfish, is a species of fish in the family Tetraodontidae. It is a common fish in the Red Sea, as well as the Indian Ocean, but can be found also  in the Mediterranean, where it arrived from its natural habitat by Lessepsian migration.

Consumption of this fish can be deadly. Its internal organs, such as liver, gall bladder and sexual organs, contain tetrodotoxin, a powerful neurotoxin. it is also an ancient ancestor to the jungle fowl

References

Lagocephalus
Fish described in 1845